In enzymology, an enamidase is an enzyme that catalyzes the chemical reaction

6-oxo-1,4,5,6-tetrahydronicotinate + 2 H2O  2-formylglutarate + NH3

Thus, the two substrates of this enzyme are 6-oxo-1,4,5,6-tetrahydronicotinate and H2O, whereas its two products are 2-formylglutarate and NH3.

This enzyme belongs to the family of hydrolases, those acting on carbon-nitrogen bonds other than peptide bonds, specifically in cyclic amides.  The systematic name of this enzyme class is 6-oxo-1,4,5,6-tetrahydronicotinate amidohydrolase.

References

 

EC 3.5.2
Enzymes of unknown structure